Hugh E. Wright (13 April 1879 – 12 February 1940) was a French-born, British actor and screenwriter. He was the father of actor Tony Wright.

Musical theatre
Charlot Revue (1925), as both lyricist (one song) and actor
Houp La! (1916), as both writer and actor
Follies (1910), as actor

Filmography

Actor 
 1066: And All That (1939, TV film)
 The Knight of the Burning Pestle (1938, TV film)
Royal Eagle (1936)
Scrooge (1935)
Widow's Might (1935)
 Adventure Ltd. (1935)
Crazy People (1934)
Get Your Man (1934)
Nell Gwyn (1934)
On the Air (1934)
Radio Parade of 1935 (1934)
A Shot in the Dark (1933)
 You Made Me Love You (1933)
Cash (1933) 
The Good Companions (1933)
The Love Wager (1933)
My Old Duchess (1933) 
 Lord Camber's Ladies (1932)
Brother Alfred (1932)
Pyjamas Preferred (1932)
Stranglehold (1931)
East Lynne on the Western Front (1931)
Down River (1931) 
The Great Gay Road (1931) 
The Silver King (1929)
 Auld Lang Syne (1929)
The Romany (1923)
 Squibs' Honeymoon (1923)
Squibs M.P. (1923)
A Sailor Tramp (1922)
Squibs Wins the Calcutta Sweep (1922)
Mary-Find-the-Gold (1921)
The Old Curiosity Shop (1921) 
Squibs (1921)
The Corner Man (1921)
Garryowen (1920)Nothing Else Matters (1920) 
Hughie at the Victory Derby (1919) The Kiddies in the Ruins (1918)
 The Romance of Old Bill'' (1918)

Writer 
Auld Lang Syne (1929)
Nothing Else Matters (1920)
Hughie at the Victory Derby (1919)

References

External links 
 
 

1879 births
1940 deaths
English male stage actors
English male film actors
English male silent film actors
British male screenwriters
20th-century English male actors
French emigrants to the United Kingdom
20th-century British screenwriters